The Barjansky Stradivarius of c.1690 is an antique cello fabricated by the Italian Cremonese luthier Antonio Stradivari (1644-1737).

Eponym
The Barjansky is named after Russian cellist Alexandre Barjansky, who played the instrument during the first half of the 20th century. Barjansky was the dedicatee of Ernest Bloch’s Schelomo which he performed on this instrument. Barjansky premiered the Delius Concerto on the instrument in Vienna in January 1923.

Age
The date of its making is unclear. In an interview with The Strad Julian Lloyd Webber said:

Description
The Sotheby's 1983 catalogue describes the Barjansky Stradivarius as being 29 7/8 inches (75.9 cm) along the back, with a golden brown varnish.

History
Barjansky was the previous owner when the Cremonese cello came up for auction at Sotheby's in 1983. It sold for a record price to British cellist Julian Lloyd Webber whose previous instrument was a Guadagnini of the 1700s. The purchase price was undisclosed.

A comparable "Strad" (the "de Pawle") sold around that time for $650,000 in New York. Itzhak Perlman bought the 1714 Soil Stradivari from Yehudi Menuhin for £600,000 in 1986.

Since then the Barjansky Stradivarius has been played by Lloyd Webber, who has made more than 30 award-winning recordings on the instrument, including a renowned version of Elgar Cello Concerto, conducted by Yehudi Menuhin.

Chapter Eight of Margaret Campbell's biography of Lloyd Webber, Married to Music, is called "The Barjansky" Strad.

The Barjansky Stradivarius has reportedly been offered for sale by the violin expert Florian Leonhard.

Recordings made with the Barjansky

Works with orchestra
 Edward Elgar - Cello Concerto, Royal Philharmonic Orchestra/Sir Yehudi Menuhin,  r.1985, Philips Classics – chosen as the 'finest ever version’ by BBC Music Magazine and winner of ‘Best Classical Recording’ 1997 Brit Awards.
 Victor Herbert - Cello Concerto No. 2, London Symphony Orchestra/Sir Charles Mackerras, r.1986,  EMI Classics
 Arthur Sullivan - Cello Concerto, (World Premiere Recording) - London Symphony Orchestra/Sir Charles Mackerras, r.1986, EMI Classics
 Edward Elgar - Romance, (World Premiere Recording) - London Symphony Orchestra/Sir Charles Mackerras, r.1986, EMI Classics
 Antonín Dvořák - Cello Concerto, Czech Philharmonic Orchestra/Vaclav Neumann, r.1988, Philips Classics. This recording is the subject of Tony Palmer's documentary Dvorak - in Love?, released on DVD in 2014.
 Arthur Honegger - Cello Concerto, English Chamber Orchestra/Yan Pascal Tortelier, r.1990, Philips Classics
 Camille Saint-Saëns - Cello Concerto No. 1, English Chamber Orchestra/Yan Pascal Tortelier, r.1990, Philips Classics
 Camille Saint-Saëns - Allegro Appassionato, English Chamber Orchestra/Yan Pascal Tortelier, r.1990, Philips Classics
 Vincent d’Indy - Lied (World Premiere Recording), English Chamber Orchestra/Yan Pascal Tortelier,  r.1990, Philips Classics
 Faure - Elegie, English Chamber Orchestra/Yan Pascal Tortelier, r.1990, Philips Classics
 Pyotr Ilyich Tchaikovsky - Variations on a Rococo Theme, London Symphony Orchestra/Maxim Shostakovich, r.1991, Philips Classics
 Pyotr Ilyich Tchaikovsky – Nocturne, Op 19 no. 4, London Symphony Orchestra/Maxim Shostakovich, r.1991, Philips Classics
 Nikolai Myaskovsky - Cello Concerto, London Symphony Orchestra/Maxim Shostakovich, r.1991, Philips Classics 
 Dmitry Shostakovich - Adagio from ‘The Limpid Stream’ (World Premiere Recording) London Symphony Orchestra/Maxim Shostakovich, r.1991, Philips Classics 
 Gavin Bryars - Cello Concerto (World Premiere Recording) English Chamber Orchestra/James Judd, r.1994, Philips Classics
 Benjamin Britten - Cello Symphony, Academy of Saint Martin-in-the-Fields/Sir Neville Marriner, r.1995, Philips Classics
 William Walton - Cello Concerto, Academy of St Martin in the Fields – Sir Neville Marriner, r.1995, Philips Classics
 Michael Nyman - Concerto for Cello, Saxophone and orchestra, (World Premiere Recording) Philharmonia Orchestra/Michael Nyman, r.1996, EMI Classics
 Max Bruch - Kol Nidrei, Royal Philharmonic Orchestra/James Judd, r.1998, Philips Classics
 Granville Bantock - Sapphic Poem, (World Premiere Recording) Royal Philharmonic Orchestra/Vernon Handley, r.1999, Hyperion
 Philip Glass - Cello Concerto, (World Premiere Recording) Royal Liverpool Philharmonic Orchestra/ Gerard Schwarz, r.2003, Orange Mountain 
 Andrew Lloyd Webber - Phantasia for violin, cello and orchestra, (World Premiere Recording), w. Sarah Chang, violin, The London Orchestra/Simon Lee, r.2004, EMI Classics
 Eric Whitacre - "The River Cam", (World Premiere Recording) London Symphony Orchestra/Eric Whitacre, r.2012, Decca
 Vivaldi Concertos for Two Cellos, w. Jiaxin Lloyd Webber (World Premiere Recordings) European Union Chamber Orchestra, r.2014, Naxos
 Piazzolla - Milonga, w. Jiaxin Lloyd Webber (World Premiere Recordings) European Union Chamber Orchestra, r.2014, Naxos
 Howard Goodall - “And the Bridge is Love” (World Premiere Recording) English Chamber Orchestra, r.2015, Naxos

Works with piano
 Malcolm Arnold - Fantasy for Cello, (World Premiere Recording) r.1986, ASV 
 Alan Rawsthorne - Cello Sonata, John McCabe (piano), r.1986, ASV
 Benjamin Britten - Cello Sonata, John McCabe (piano), r.1988, Philips Classics
 Sergei Prokofiev - Ballade, (World Premiere Recording) John McCabe (piano), r.1988, Philips Classics
 Dmitri Shostakovich - Cello Sonata, John McCabe (piano), r.1988, Philips Classics
 Frank Bridge - Scherzetto, (World Premiere Recording), John McCabe (piano), r.1991, ASV
 Charles Villiers Stanford - Cello Sonata No. 2, (World Premiere Recording) John McCabe, r.1991, ASV
 Edvard Grieg - Cello Sonata, Bengt Forsberg (piano), r.1995, Philips Classics
 Edvard Grieg - Intermezzo (World Premiere Recording), Philips Classics
 Frederick Delius - Cello Sonata, Bengt Forsberg (piano), r.1995, Philips Classics
 Frederick Delius - Caprice and Elegy, Bengt Forsberg (piano), r.1993, Philips Classics
 Frederick Delius - Serenade from ‘Hassan’, Bengt Forsberg (piano), r.1993, Philips Classics

Semi-classical
 Oasis, (World Premiere Recording) with Peter Skellern and Mary Hopkin, r.1984 Warner
 Two Worlds, with Lee Ritenour and Dave Grusin, r.2000, Decca

Collections
 Travels with my Cello , English Chamber Orchestra/Nicholas Cleobury, r.1984, Philips Classics
 Encore! – Travels with my Cello Vol.2, Royal Philharmonic Orchestra/ Nicholas Cleobury, r.1986, Philips Classics
 Cello Song, John Lenehan (piano), r.1993, Philips Classics
 English Idyll, Academy of St Martin-in-the-Fields, Sir Neville Marriner, r.1994, Philips Classics
 Cradle Song , John Lenehan (piano), Richard Rodney Bennett (piano), Pam Chowhan (piano), r.1995, Philips Classics
 Cello Moods , Royal Philharmonic Orchestra/James Judd, r.1998, Philips Classics
 Elegy, r.1999, Philips Classics
 Lloyd Webber Plays Lloyd Webber,  r.2001, Philips Classics
 Made in England / Gentle Dreams, r.2003, Decca
 Unexpected Songs, John Lenehan (piano), Pam Chowhan (piano), Catrin Finch (harp), Michael Ball, r.2006, EMI Classics
 Fair Albion - Music by Patrick Hawes, (World Premiere Recordings) r.2009, Signum Classics
 The Art of Julian Lloyd Webber, r.2011, Decca
 Evening Songs – Music by Frederick Delius and John Ireland, w. Jiaxin Lloyd Webber (cello), John Lenehan (piano), r.2012, Naxos
 A Tale of Two Cellos, w. Jiaxin Lloyd Webber (cello), John Lenehan (piano), Catrin Finch (harp), r.2013, Naxos

First performances using the Barjansky
 Frederick Delius, Cello Concerto, Frankfurt, Germany, January 1923
 Vaughan Williams, Fantasia on Sussex Folk Tunes for Cello and Orchestra, Three Choirs Festival, Gloucester, August 1983
 Edward Elgar, Romance for Cello and Piano, Wigmore Hall, London, April 1985
 Arthur Sullivan, Cello Concerto, London Symphony Orchestra/Mackerras, Barbican Centre, London, April 1986
 Malcolm Arnold, Fantasy for Cello, Wigmore Hall, London, December 1987
 Malcolm Arnold, Cello Concerto, Royal Philharmonic Orchestra/Handley, Royal Festival Hall, London, March 1989
 Richard Rodney Bennett, Dream Sequence for Cello and Piano, John Lenehan (piano), Wigmore Hall, London, December 1994
 Vladimir Godar, Barcarolle for Cello, Strings, Harp and Harpsichord, Hellenic Centre, London, April 1994
 Gavin Bryars, Cello Concerto (Farewell to Philosophy), English Chamber Orchestra/James Judd, Barbican Centre, London, November 1995
 William Lloyd Webber, Nocturne for Cello and Piano, John Lill (piano), Purcell Room, London, February 1995
 Christopher Headington, Serenade for Cello and Strings, English Chamber Orchestra, Banqueting House, London, January 1995
 Michael Nyman, Concerto for Cello and Saxophone, Philharmonia/James Judd, Royal Festival Hall, London, March 1997
 William Walton, Theme for a Prince for Solo Cello, Adrian Boult Hall, Birmingham, October 1998
 Karl Jenkins, Benedictus for Cello, Choir and Orchestra from 'The Armed Man', National Youth Choir of Great Britain and the National 
 Musicians Symphony Orchestra, Royal Albert Hall, London, April 2000
 Philip Glass, Cello Concerto, China Philharmonic Orchestra/Long Yu, Beijing Festival, China, September 2001
 James MacMillan, Cello Sonata No.2, John Lenehan (piano), Queens Hall, Edinburgh, April 2001
 Howard Goodall, And the Bridge is Love for Cello and Strings Festival Orchestra/Thomas Hull, Chipping Campden Festival, May 2008
 Patrick Hawes, Gloriette for Cello and Piano, Leeds Castle, Kent, August 2008
 Andrew Lloyd Webber, Phantasia (Concerto for Violin, Cello and Orchestra), Izmir Festival, Turkey, July 2008
 Eric Whitacre, The River Cam for cello and strings, Philharmonia Orchestra/Whitacre, Royal Festival Hall, London, April 2011

All first performances were by Julian Lloyd Webber, except the January 1923 concerto by Alexandre Barjansky.

References

External links
 Gramophone article referencing the Barjansky.
 The Strad article on the Barjansky.
  Review highlighting the cello’s qualities.
  Performance of Elgar’s Cello Concerto on the Barjansky Stradivarius
  Biography of Julian Lloyd Webber

1690 works
Stradivari cellos
Stradivari instruments